The South African Railways Class 7C 4-8-0 of 1902 was a steam locomotive from the pre-Union era in the Cape of Good Hope.

In 1902, the Cape Government Railways placed its last ten 7th Class  Mastodon type steam locomotives in service on the Cape Eastern System. In 1912, when all these locomotives were assimilated into the South African Railways, they were renumbered and designated .

Manufacturer
The last of the 7th Class locomotives to be ordered by the Cape Government Railways (CGR), were ten for the Cape Eastern System. They were built by Neilson, Reid and Company in 1901 and delivered and placed in service in 1902, with engine numbers in the range from 759 to 768.

The original Cape 7th Class locomotive had been designed in 1892 by H.M. Beatty, at the time the Cape Government Railways (Western System) Locomotive Superintendent.

This last batch of locomotives differed from all previous 7th Class models in having a large commodious cab with double windows on each side, similar to those which were fitted to the ex Central South African Railways (CSAR) Class 7B locomotives. This afforded better protection for the crew. They were more than  heavier than the original 7th Class locomotives, with larger diameter boilers with a higher boiler pressure. Their power was further improved by their increased cylinder diameter.

Class 7 sub-classes
When the Union of South Africa was established on 31 May 1910, the three Colonial government railways (CGR, Natal Government Railways and Central South African Railways) were united under a single administration to control and administer the railways, ports and harbours of the Union. Although the South African Railways and Harbours came into existence in 1910, the actual classification and renumbering of all the rolling stock of the three constituent railways were only implemented with effect from 1 January 1912.

When these locomotives were assimilated into the South African Railways (SAR) in 1912, they were renumbered in the range from 1059 to 1068 and designated Class 7C.

Other Class 7 locomotives which came onto the SAR roster from the CGR and other Colonial railways in the region, namely the CSAR, the Natal Government Railways (NGR), some from the Rhodesia Railways (RR) and, in 1925, from the New Cape Central Railways (NCCR), were grouped into another six sub-classes by the SAR, becoming SAR Classes 7, 7A, 7B and 7D to 7F.

Modifications
During the 1930s, many of the Class 7 series locomotives were equipped with superheated boilers and piston valves. On the Classes 7B and 7C, this conversion was sometimes indicated with an "S" suffix to the class number on the locomotive number plates, but on the rest of the Class 7 family this distinction was not applied consistently. The superheated versions could be identified by the position of the chimney on the smokebox. The chimney was displaced forward on the superheated engines to provide space behind it in the smokebox for the superheater header.

Service

South Africa
In SAR service, the Class 7 series worked on every system in the country. They remained in branch line service until they were finally withdrawn in 1972.

South West Africa
In 1915, shortly after the outbreak of the First World War, the German South West Africa colony was occupied by the Union Defence Forces. Since a large part of the territory's railway infrastructure and rolling stock was destroyed or damaged by retreating German forces, an urgent need arose for locomotives for use on the Cape gauge lines in that territory. In 1917, numbers 1065 to 1067 were transferred to the Defence Department for service in South West Africa.

These three locomotives remained in South West Africa after the war. They proved to be so successful in that territory that more were gradually transferred there in later years. By the time the Class 24 locomotives arrived in SWA in 1949, 53 locomotives of the Class 7 family were still in use there. Most remained there and were only transferred back to South Africa when the Class 32-000 diesel-electric locomotives replaced them in 1961.

Preservation
Only one of these locomotives has survived into preservation. Locomotive no. 1062 has been preserved at Prieska Station Forecourt.

References

1480
1480
4-8-0 locomotives
2D locomotives
Neilson Reid locomotives
Cape gauge railway locomotives
Railway locomotives introduced in 1902
1902 in South Africa
Scrapped locomotives